Magherabeg railway station was on the Banbridge, Lisburn and Belfast Railway which ran from Knockmore Junction to Banbridge in Northern Ireland.

History

The station was opened by the Great Northern Railway (Ireland) on 1 October 1929 and closed on 30 April 1956.

References 

Disused railway stations in County Down
Railway stations opened in 1929
Railway stations closed in 1956
1929 establishments in Northern Ireland
1956 disestablishments in Northern Ireland
Railway stations in Northern Ireland opened in the 20th century